Pláka is the old historical neighborhood of Athens, clustered around the northern and eastern slopes of the Acropolis, and incorporating labyrinthine streets and neoclassical architecture. Plaka is built on top of the residential areas of the ancient town of Athens. It is known as the "Neighborhood of the Gods" due to its proximity to the Acropolis and its many archaeological sites.

Name 

The name Plaka was not in use until after the Greek War of Independence. Instead, the Athenians of that time referred to the area by various names such as Alikokou, Kontito, or Kandili, or by the names of the local churches.  The name Plaka became commonly in use in the first years of the rule of King Otto. The origin of the name is uncertain: it has been theorized to come from Arvanite Pliak Athena, meaning 'Old Athens', from Albanian plak 'old', or from the presence of a plaque (Greek: πλάκα; romanized: plaka) which once marked its central intersection.

Location
Plaka is on the northeast slope of Acropolis, between Syntagma and Monastiraki square. Adrianou Street (running north and south) is the largest and most central street in Plaka and divides it into two areas: the upper level, - Ano Plaka - located right under the Acropolis and the lower level - Kato Plaka - situated between Syntagma and Monastiraki.

History
Plaka was developed mostly around  the ruins of Ancient Agora of Athens in an area that has been continuously inhabited since antiquity. During the years of Ottoman rule, Plaka was known as the "Turkish quarter of Athens", and the seat of the Turkish Voevode (Governor). During the Greek War of Independence, Plaka like the rest of Athens, was temporarily abandoned by its inhabitants because of the severe battles that took place in 1826. The area was repopulated during the first years of the reign of Otto of Greece.  Plaka had a sizable Arvanite community till the late 19th century, which led some to refer to it as the   Arvanite quarter of Athens. At the same period the neighborhood of Anafiotika, featuring traditional Cycladic architecture, was built by settlers from the Aegean island of Anafi.

In 1884 a fire burned down a large part of the neighborhood which gave the opportunity for the archaeologists to conduct excavations in the Roman Market and Hadrian’s library. Excavations have been taking place continuously since the 19th century.

Modern neighbourhood
Plaka is visited by hundreds of thousands of tourists around the year, and is under strict zoning and conservation regulations, as the only neighborhood in Athens where all utilities (water, power, cable television, telephone, internet, and sewage) lie underground in fully accessible, custom-made tunneling.

Museums in Plaka include:

Acropolis Museum
Athens University Museum
Frissiras Museum
Jewish Museum of Greece
Museum of Greek Folk Art, an annex of which is the Old Public Baths building
Museum of Greek Folk Musical Instruments
Museum of Pavlos and Alexandra Kanellopoulou

Cinema
Many movies of the Greek cinema were filmed in the area. Some of them include:
And the Wife Shall Revere Her Husband
The Drunkard (film)
What If..., Christoforos Papakaliatis movie
Woe to the Young

Gallery

References

External link

Tourist attractions in Athens
Neighbourhoods in Athens
Arvanite settlements